The Palazzo Giustiniani Businello is Gothic-style palace located on the Grand Canal, in the Sestiere of San Polo, adjacent to the Palazzo Papadopoli, in Venice, Italy.

History
The palace was commissioned in the 13th century by the aristocratic Morosini family, but later transferred to the Giustiniani family. In the 18th century, the Businello became owners of the palace. In the 19th century, it housed the dancer Maria Taglioni. The building has undergone a number of renovations.

See also
Palazzo Giustinian
Palazzo Giustinian Pesaro
Palazzo Giustinian Lolin

Bibliography

References

Giustiniani Businello
Giustiniani Businello
Gothic architecture in Venice